The 2020–21 Austrian Football Second League  was the 47th season of the Austrian second-level football league and the third as the Second League. The league contains 16 teams with one team being promoted to the Austrian Football Bundesliga and no teams being relegated to the Austrian Regionalliga after the 2020–21 Austrian Regionalliga season was abandoned.

Teams
Sixteen teams participated in the 2020–21 season. The only promoted team was Rapid Wien II from the Austrian Regionalliga East.

Due to the bankruptcy of SV Mattersburg, no club was relegated from the 2019–20 Austrian Football Bundesliga.

Personnel and kits

League table

Season statistics

Top goalscorers
.

Top assists
.

See also
 2020–21 Austrian Football Bundesliga
 2020–21 Austrian Cup

References

External links
 Official website 
 Page on AustriaSoccer.at 

2. Liga (Austria) seasons
2020–21 in Austrian football
Aus